= Vararakn (disambiguation) =

Vararakn (Armenian: Վարարակն, lit. 'rapid spring') may refer to:

- Vararakn, the historical Armenian name of Stepanakert, the capital of the former Republic of Artsakh
- Vararakn river, a river in the Syunik Province of Armenia
